This is a list of the brigades raised by the Australian Army. The list includes brigades that served in World War I, World War II, Vietnam and the present-day brigades.

Current active brigades

World War I

Light horse

 1st Light Horse Brigade  
 2nd Light Horse Brigade  
 3rd Light Horse Brigade  
 4th Light Horse Brigade 
 5th Light Horse Brigade

Infantry

World War II

Armoured

1st Armoured Brigade
2nd Armoured Brigade
3rd Army Tank Brigade
4th Armoured Brigade
6th Armoured Brigade

Cavalry
1st Cavalry Brigade
2nd Cavalry Brigade
3rd Cavalry Brigade
4th Cavalry Brigade
6th Cavalry Brigade

Support Group
1st Support Group

Motor
1st Motor Brigade
2nd Motor Brigade
3rd Motor Brigade
4th Motor Brigade
5th Motor Brigade
6th Motor Brigade

Infantry

Garrison
1st Garrison Brigade
2nd Garrison Brigade
3rd Garrison Brigade
5th Garrison Brigade

Training
1st Training Brigade
2nd Division Infantry Training Brigade
4th Training Brigade
6th Training Brigade
7th Training Brigade
9th Training Brigade

Artillery
The following artillery formations were all called brigades by the army but with three batteries assigned they were only the size of an artillery regiment.

Anti Aircraft Artillery
1st Anti-Aircraft Brigade

Field artillery

Medium Artillery
1st Medium Brigade
2nd Medium Brigade

Heavy Artillery
1st Heavy Brigade	
2nd Heavy Brigade
3rd Heavy Brigade
5th Heavy Brigade
6th Heavy Brigade
7th Heavy Brigade

Occupation of Japan

 34th Brigade (part of the BCOF and later renamed to 1st Brigade)

Vietnam
 1st Australian Task Force

Further reading
 
 
 

 
Army brigades